Andy Valmorbida is an international fine art entrepreneur. He is currently president of Unitled-1 Holdings and spearheaded River-Labs, a new company in the Generative Digital Art Movement. He became known as the "King of Pop Up" after 45 pop up art shows in 12 countries exhibiting largely street art, notably Richard Hambleton, Futura, Basquiait, Bacon and more.

Career 
Although Valmorbida was born and studied business in Australia, he started work at his family's New York investment firm and became a disruptor in the international art and art licensing world.

Valmorbida moved from Wall Street to street art at the age of 25.

After meeting artist Richard Hambleton in 2009, Valmorbida teamed up with Vladimir Restoin-Roitfeld in 2011 to promote Richard Hambleton's art. Giorgio Armani, an avid collector of Hambleton’s work, sponsored several of the "pop up" celebrity attended art shows exhibiting Hambleton's works which quickly rose in value.

Valmorbida acted as executive producer on the 2017 documentary Shadowman reflecting Hambleton's life and career.

In 2010 Valmorbida helped curate and assisted with the donation of two Hambleton pieces to the amfAR 17th Annual Cinema Against AIDS Gala During the Cannes Film Festival. The pieces sold for $920,000.

Valmorida was described as "serially dishonest" in a judgment from a civil case in Jersey in which he was referred to the local Attorney-General over the alleged frauds and attempts to disguise his tax residence.

Personal life 
Valmorbida was born into one of the wealthiest families in Melbourne, Australia and raised in New York City. His father was Paul Valmorbida. 

Valmorbida has two children.

References

External links

Australian art dealers
Living people
Year of birth missing (living people)